is a Japanese voice actress affiliated with Ken Production.

Filmography

Anime

OVA

Movies

Video Games

Dubbing
Bootmen (Linda (Sophie Lee))
Clueless (Tai Frasier (Brittany Murphy))

References

External links
 平松 晶子 at Ken Production 
 

1967 births
Living people
Japanese video game actresses
Japanese voice actresses
Ken Production voice actors
Voice actresses from Tokyo
20th-century Japanese actresses
21st-century Japanese actresses